The Roman Catholic  Diocese of Celaya (erected 13 October 1973) is a suffragan diocese of the Archdiocese of León. It was a suffragan of the Archdiocese of San Luis Potosí until 25 November 2006.

Bishops

Ordinaries
Victorino Alvarez Tena (1974–1987) 
Jesús Humberto Velázquez Garay (1988–2003)
Lázaro Pérez Jiménez (2003–2009)
Benjamín Castillo Plascencia (2010–2021)
Víctor Alejandro Aguilar Ledesma (2021–present)

Other priest of this diocese who became bishop
Gonzalo Alonso Calzada Guerrero, appointed Auxiliary Bishop of Antequera, Oaxaca in 2012

Episcopal See
Celaya, Guanajuato

See also
Immaculate Conception Cathedral, Celaya

External links and references
Diócesis de Celaya official site

Celaya
Celaya, Roman Catholic Diocese of
Celaya
Celaya